WOW is an EP by German electronic music duo Mouse on Mars. It was released on Monkeytown Records in 2012.

Production
According to its press release, WOW was recorded within "just a few weeks" and will offer a more "club-oriented counterpoint to [their previous album] Parastrophics". It features guest appearances from Dao Anh Khanh, Eric D. Clarke, and Las Kellies.

Critical reception
Larry Fitzmaurice of Pitchfork gave the EP a 7.0 out of 10, saying, "WOW lacks the gut-punch energy of Parastrophics, but it's still an enjoyable twist on what else can be done with the already malleable world of bass music; once again Mouse on Mars refuse to stay in one place, but they almost always head somewhere interesting."

Track listing

Personnel
Credits adapted from liner notes.

 Jan St. Werner – composition, production
 Andi Toma – composition, production
 Dao Anh Khanh – vocals (1, 6, 8, 12)
 Las Kellies – vocals (3)
 Eric D. Clarke – vocals (9)

References

External links
 
 

2012 debut EPs
Mouse on Mars albums